Aron Stasiak (born 19 February 1999) is a Polish professional footballer who plays as a forward for Olimpia Elbląg, on loan from Pogoń Szczecin.

References

External links

1999 births
Living people
Polish footballers
Poland youth international footballers
Association football forwards
Lech Poznań players
Pogoń Szczecin players
Wigry Suwałki players
Górnik Łęczna players
Olimpia Elbląg players
Ekstraklasa players
I liga players
II liga players
III liga players